Toxicodryas is a genus of rear-fanged venomous snakes in the family Colubridae.

Geographic range
The genus Toxicodryas is native to Sub-Saharan Africa.

Species
Four species are recognized as being valid.
Toxicodryas adamanteus 
Toxicodryas blandingii 
Toxicodryas pulverulenta 
Toxicodryas vexator 

Nota bene: A binomial authority in parentheses indicates that the species was originally described in a genus other than Toxicodryas.

References

Further reading
Hallowell E (1857). "Notice of a collection of Reptiles from the Gaboon country, West Africa, recently presented to the Academy of Natural Sciences of Philadelphia, by Dr. Henry A. Ford". Proceedings of the Academy of Natural Sciences of Philadelphia 9: 48–72. (Toxicodryas, new genus, p. 60).

Toxicodryas
Snake genera